The 2002 NCAA Division I-AA football season, part of college football in the United States organized by the National Collegiate Athletic Association (NCAA) at the Division I-AA level, began in August 2002, and concluded with the 2002 NCAA Division I-AA Football Championship Game on December 20, 2002, at Finley Stadium in Chattanooga, Tennessee. The Western Kentucky Hilltoppers won their first I-AA championship, defeating the McNeese State Cowboys by a final score of 34−14.

Conference changes and new programs

Conference standings

Conference champions

Postseason

NCAA Division I-AA playoff bracket
The top four teams in the tournament were seeded; seeded teams were assured of hosting games in the first two rounds.

* Denotes host institution

References